Sphinx is an album by Soviet jazz ensemble Allegro Jazz Ensemble recorded between 1981-1986 and released on the Mobile Fidelity label.

Reception

The AllMusic review by Scott Yanow called Sphinx "An above average (if not overly distinctive) modern mainstream release."

Track listing
''Compositions by Nikolay Levinovsky.

 "In This World: First Movement"  - 6:27
 "In This World: Second Movement" - 4:37
 "In This World: Third Movement"  - 8:09
 "In This World: Fourth Movement"  - 4:31
 "Legend: First Movement" - 7:50
 "Legend: Second Movement" - 7:21
 "Legend: Third Movement" - 5:38
 "Sphinx" - 9:46
 "Portrait" - 13:45

References 

1986 albums
Melodiya albums